Edward Samuel Corwin (January 19, 1878 – April 23, 1963) was an American legal scholar who served as the president of the American Political Science Association. His various political writings in the early to mid-twentieth century microcosmically depict the rising activist thinking in various areas of American, constitutional law.

Biography
Corwin was born in Plymouth, Michigan on January 19, 1878. He received his undergraduate degree from the University of Michigan in 1900; and his Ph.D. from the University of Pennsylvania in 1905. He was invited to join the faculty of Princeton University by Woodrow Wilson in 1905. In 1908 he was appointed the McCormick Professor of Jurisprudence. He authored many books on United States constitutional law, and he remained at Princeton until he retired in 1946.  He died on April 23, 1963 and was buried in Princeton Cemetery.  He was reinterred to Riverside Cemetery near his birthplace in Plymouth, Michigan, where he is buried with his wife, parents, and other family members.

A full biography of Corwin, with a comprehensive bibliography of his numerous publications, was written by Kenneth Crews and published in 1985.

Bibliography
John Marshall and the Constitution; a chronicle of the Supreme court (1919)
The Constitution and What It Means Today (1920)
The President, Office and Powers (1940)
The Constitution and World Organization (1944)
Total War and the Constitution (1946)
The Constitution of the United States of America: Analysis and Interpretation (1952) (Editor)
The "Higher Law" Background of American Constitutional Law (1965)
 French Policy And The American Alliance Of 1778  (1916)

References

External links
Edward S. Corwin Papers at the Seeley G. Mudd Manuscript Library, Princeton University
 
 
 

1878 births
1963 deaths
American political scientists
University of Michigan alumni
University of Pennsylvania alumni
Princeton University faculty
Burials at Princeton Cemetery
People from Plymouth, Michigan